Joannes Adamus Gaiger (Slovenized as Janez Adam Gaiger,  1667 – April 28, 1722; monastic name Hypolythus Neostadiensis or Hippolytus Rudolphswertensis 'Hippolytus of Novo Mesto', Slovenized as ) was a Slovene philologist, religious writer, lexicographer, translator, and Capuchin.

Gaiger was born in Novo Mesto circa 1667. After studying with the Jesuits in Ljubljana, he joined the Capuchin order in 1684. He taught philosophy at monasteries in Maribor and Graz, and then theology in the Ljubljana area. In 1712 he published his Dictionarium trilingue, a trilingual dictionary of Latin, German, and Slovene. In 1715 he published a revised edition of Adam Bohorič's grammar Grammatica latino-germanico-slavonica (Latin–German–Slovene Grammar), and that same year a third edition of the 1613 work Evangelia inu lystuvi (Gospels and Epistles). Gaiger died in Kranj in 1722.

Notes

References

1667 births
1722 deaths
Slovenian philologists
Slovenian lexicographers
Slovenian translators
Slovenian Friars Minor